

The Albatros L 59 was a single-seat German utility aircraft of the 1920s. It was a single-engine low-wing cantilever monoplane with large, spatted wide track undercarriage attached, unusually for the time not to the fuselage but to the wing roots. The whole aircraft was covered in 3-ply.

The L.59 was flying by September 1923.

Variants

L.59 Single seat,  Siemens-Halske Sh.4 5-cylinder radial. One built.
L.60 Two seats,  Siemens-Halske Sh 5 7-cylinder radial.  Identical dimensions, slightly heavier empty and faster both level and climbing. Three built.

Specifications (L 59)
Data from Flight 13 September 1923, pp. 581–2

References

 

Low-wing aircraft
Single-engined tractor aircraft
1920s German sport aircraft
L 059
Aircraft first flown in 1923